Nicaria may refer to

 Another name for Icaria, a Greek island
 A German ship, launched 1901, seized by the United States and renamed 
 Nicaria (moth), a genus of moths